Raymond William Reed (30 April 1932 – 8 May 1970) was a Rhodesian racing driver born in Gwelo, Southern Rhodesia. He was entered in the 1965 South African Grand Prix in his self-built RE-Alfa Romeo, but did not take part and had earlier participated in the non-championship 1964 Rand Grand Prix. Reed was killed along with his three children in an aircraft accident on 8 May 1970 near Nottingham Road, Natal in South Africa. He had been deemed to be flying in weather conditions under which he was not qualified or legally permitted to fly.

Racing record

Complete Formula One World Championship results
(key)

Non-championship Formula One results
(key)

References

Profile at ManipeF1.com 
Profile at StatsF1.com

White Rhodesian people
1965 deaths
Sportspeople from Gweru
Rhodesian Formula One drivers
Victims of aviation accidents or incidents in South Africa
1932 births